In particle physics, weak isospin is a quantum number relating to the electrically charged part of the weak interaction: Particles with half-integer weak isospin can interact with the  bosons; particles with zero weak isospin do not.
Weak isospin is a construct parallel to the idea of isospin under the strong interaction.
It can be understood as the eigenvalue of a charge operator.

The weak isospin conservation law relates to the conservation of  weak interactions conserve . It is also conserved by the electromagnetic and strong interactions. However, interaction with the Higgs field does not conserve , as directly seen by propagation of fermions, mixing chiralities by dint of their mass terms resulting from their Higgs couplings. Since the Higgs field vacuum expectation value is nonzero, particles interact with this field all the time even in vacuum. Interaction with the Higgs field changes particles' weak isospin (and weak hypercharge). Only a specific combination of them,  (electric charge), is conserved.

Relation with chirality
Fermions with negative chirality (also called "left-handed" fermions) have  and can be grouped into doublets with  that behave the same way under the weak interaction. By convention, electrically charged fermions are assigned  with the same sign as their electric charge.
For example, up-type quarks (u, c, t) have  and always transform into down-type quarks (d, s, b), which have  and vice versa.

Fermions with positive chirality ("right-handed" fermions) and anti-fermions with negative chirality ("left-handed" anti-fermions) have  and form singlets that do not undergo charged weak interactions.

The electric charge,  is related to weak isospin,  and weak hypercharge,  by

Weak isospin and the W bosons
  boson  is emitted in transitions  → 
  boson  would be emitted in weak interactions where  does not change, such as neutrino scattering.
  boson  is emitted in transitions  → . 

The sum of negative isospin and positive charge is zero for each of the bosons, consequently, all the electroweak bosons have weak hypercharge  so unlike gluons of the color force, the electroweak bosons are unaffected by the force they mediate.

See also
Weak hypercharge
Weak charge

Footnotes

References

Standard Model
Flavour (particle physics)
Electroweak theory

he:איזוספין חלש